Josef Meissner (born 21 October 1893) was aCzechoslovak football manager who coached Czechoslovakia in the 1938 FIFA World Cup.

References

1893 births
Sportspeople from Prague
Czechoslovak football managers
Czechoslovakia national football team managers
1938 FIFA World Cup managers
Year of death missing